A chief product officer (CPO), sometimes known as head of product, is a corporate title referring to an executive responsible for various product-related activities in an organization. The CPO is to the business's product what the CTO is to technology. They focus on bringing the product strategy to align with the business strategy and to deploy that throughout the organization. They are most common in technology companies, or organizations where technology is now a large part of the way they serve customers (such as banks and newspapers).

Role
A CPO is responsible for all product-related matters. Usually includes product strategy, product vision, product innovation, product design, product development, project management and product marketing. In many tech companies, this position includes distribution, manufacturing, and procurement.

References

Corporate governance
Management occupations